"We Almost Got It Together" is a song by British singer-songwriter Tanita Tikaram, released in 1990 as the lead single from her second studio album, The Sweet Keeper (1990). It was written by Tikaram, and produced by Peter van Hooke and Rod Argent. The song was a top 30 hit in Finland, Ireland and Italy, while peaking within the top 40 in Belgium and the Netherlands.

Critical reception
Upon its release, Adam Sweeting of The Guardian commented: "The single suggests that for the time being, the Basingstoke Balladress is sticking to the tried and true. It's pleasantly uptempo and has a saxophone on it to offset Tanita's brown, sombre voice, though it's unlikely to gain admission to anybody's list of all-time classics." Simon Frith of The Observer noted: "Tikaram hasn't been changed at all by success - she's still gloomy in an overblown, wordy, sweeping sort of way."

Music & Media wrote: "A jolly song with an uptempo feel and catchy guitar riff. Radio friendly and very pleasant." Tim Southwell of Record Mirror praised the song for being more similar to the "majestic" "Good Tradition" rather than Tikaram's following singles which Southwell felt contained lyrics "that made most of the country want to hide in their sleeping bags". He described "We Almost Got It Together" as "an important step back in the right direction of pure pop rather than crass self-indulgence".

In a review of The Sweet Keeper, Jasmine Hightower of The Daily Tar Heel described the song as a "charming, happy-go-lucky song with an even beat that glides through the air and gently purrs into the ear." David Okamoto of the Tampa Bay Times noted the song's "chugging guitars" and "soulful saxophone solo". He added: "[It's] the album's most engaging track and joins her previous LP's "Good Tradition" and "World Outside Your Window" as convincing proof of her remarkably keen pop sense." Brent Ainsworth of the Santa Cruz Sentinel considered the song a "lame, unsexy love song with a pitifully sophomoric melody."

Track listing
 7" and cassette single
"We Almost Got It Together" - 3:59
"Love Story" - 3:16

 12" and CD single
"We Almost Got It Together" - 3:59
"Love Story" - 3:16
"Over You All" (Studio Version) - 3:17

 CD single
"We Almost Got It Together" - 3:59
"Love Story" - 3:16
"Over You All" (Studio Version) - 3:17
"Rose on Wood" - 4:30

 CD single (US promo)
"We Almost Got It Together" (LP Version) - 3:59

Personnel
 Tanita Tikaram - vocals
 Mark Creswell - guitar
 Rod Argent - keyboards
 Richie Buckley - tenor saxophone
 Rory McFarlane - bass
 Peter Van Hooke - drums

Production
 Peter van Hooke, Rod Argent - producers, mixing
 Simon Hurrell - engineer, mixing

Other
 T & CP Associates - design, illustration
 Deborah Feingold - photography

Charts

References

1990 songs
1990 singles
Tanita Tikaram songs
Songs written by Tanita Tikaram
Song recordings produced by Rod Argent
East West Records singles